John Andrew Peacock, FRS, FRSE (born 27 March 1956) is a British cosmologist, astronomer, and academic. He has been Professor of Cosmology at the University of Edinburgh since 1998. He was joint-winner of the 2014 Shaw Prize.

Early life and education
Peacock was born on 27 March 1956 in Shaftesbury, Dorset, England, to Arthur Peacock and Isobel Peacock (née Moir). He studied Natural Sciences at Jesus College, Cambridge, and graduated with a first class Bachelor of Arts (BA) degree in 1977. He then undertook postgraduate research at the University of Cambridge's Cavendish Laboratory under the supervision of M. S. Longair and J. V. Wall. He completed his Doctor of Philosophy (PhD) degree in 1981 with a doctoral thesis titled "The radio spectra and cosmological evolution of extragalactic radio sources".

Personal life
In 1982, Peacock married Heather, a nurse and medical educator. Together, they have three children.

Honours
In 2006, Peacock was elected Fellow of the Royal Society of Edinburgh (FRSE). In 2007, he was elected Fellow of the Royal Society (FRS). In 2014, he was jointly awarded the Shaw Prize for Astronomy 'for their contributions to the measurements of features in the large-scale structure of galaxies used to constrain the cosmological model including baryon acoustic oscillations and redshift-space distortions'. His co-recipients were Daniel Eisenstein and Shaun Cole.

References

1956 births
Living people
Academics of the University of Edinburgh
British astrophysicists
British cosmologists
Scottish astronomers
Fellows of the Royal Society of Edinburgh
Fellows of the Royal Society
People from Shaftesbury
Alumni of Jesus College, Cambridge
21st-century British physicists